Balo is a Grassfields language of Cameroon. Alunfa is distinct and perhaps should be considered a different language.

Balo and Alunfa are poorly documented and for a time had been considered Tivoid languages.

References

Southwest Grassfields languages
Languages of Cameroon